The Republic of San Marino is a European country completely surrounded by Italy.

San Marino may also refer to:

 Saint Marinus, the founder of the state of San Marino
 City of San Marino, the capital city of the Republic of San Marino
 San Marino (river), a river in the Italian peninsula
 Autodromo Enzo e Dino Ferrari, the circuit that hosts the San Marino Grand Prix
 San Marino, California, a city in Los Angeles County, United States
 San Marino Calcio, a football club in the Republic of San Marino that plays in the Italian Serie C2
San Marino, Croatia, a hamlet and a ferry port on the island of Rab
 San Marino Brand, a Philippine canned seafood brand manufactured by CDO Foodsphere

See also
 Marino (disambiguation)